ØKAW Arkitekter is an architecture firm based in Oslo, Norway and established in 1969. As of 2017, partners are Tom Wike, Øystein Midtbø, Rolf Erik Wahlstrøm, Trine Hauge, Hanne Sørbø, Elisabeth Edin Ruge, Tone Andreassen, Nicca Gade Christensen, Sturla Sandsdalen, Lasse Brøgger and Margrethe Maisey.

Projects include Akershus University College (2003), Holmenkollen National Arena (2010), Midtstubakken (2010), Lysgårdsbakken (1993), Birkebeineren Ski Stadium (1993), Kanthaugen Freestyle Arena (1993), Hotel Opera (2001), the operations area of Oslo Airport, Gardermoen (1999), Kreditkassen Headquarters (1987), several sections of Ullevål University Hospital (1987–2005) and Furuset Station (1978).

References
http://okaw.no/om-oss/

External links
 Official site

Architecture firms of Norway
Companies based in Oslo
Design companies established in 1969
Norwegian companies established in 1969